Land of Hope and Glory is a 1927 British silent drama film directed by Harley Knoles and starring Ellaline Terriss, Lyn Harding and Robin Irvine. It was inspired by Edward Elgar's 1902 song Land of Hope and Glory.

Cast
 Ellaline Terriss as Mrs Whiteford 
 Lyn Harding as Roger Whiteford 
 Robin Irvine as Ben Whiteford 
 Ruby Miller as Myra Almazov 
 Enid Stamp-Taylor as Jane 
 Arthur Pusey as Matt Whiteford 
 Henry Vibart as Sir John Maxeter 
 Lewin Mannering as Boris Snide 
 Kenneth McLaglen as Stan Whiteford

References

Bibliography
 Low, Rachael. History of the British Film, 1918-1929. George Allen & Unwin, 1971.

External links

1927 films
1920s English-language films
Films directed by Harley Knoles
1927 drama films
British drama films
Films shot at Isleworth Studios
British black-and-white films
British silent feature films
1920s British films
Silent drama films